Scutiger wuguanfui is a species of toad in the family Megophryidae. It is endemic to Tibet and only known from its type locality in the Medog County. The specific name wuguanfui honours Wu Guanfu, a Chinese herpetologist. Common names Wu's lazy toad, Medog lazy toad and Medog cat-eyed toad have been coined for it.

Description
Adult males measure  and adult females, based on a single specimen only,  in snout–vent length. The body is stout and the head is large. There is no tympanum, but the supratympanic fold is distinct. The forelimbs are comparatively long. The fingers have rounded tips and are free of webbing. The hind limbs are comparatively short. The toes have rounded tips and weakly developed dermal fringes and webbing. Skin is rough. The dorsum is dark brown, becoming lighter on the flanks. The loreal real region as well as the supratympanic fold are brownish-black. The lips are light brown. The belly is grayish-brown. Males have a single internal subgular vocal sac.

The male advertisement call is a loud, toneless croaking like "ong...ong...ong...".

Habitat and conservation
Individuals were hiding under the logs in daytime but became active after sundown, squatting on leaf litter or peering from under the fallen trees. Males call throughout the night, sometimes even in the afternoon.

As of late 2018, this species had not been included in the IUCN Red List of Threatened Species.

References

wuguanfui
Frogs of China
Endemic fauna of Tibet
Amphibians described in 2012